The Raquette River, sometimes spelled Racquette, originates at Raquette Lake in the Adirondack Mountains in New York.   long, it is the third longest river entirely in the state of New York.

The river is a popular destination for canoeing and kayaking. It passes through many natural and man-made lakes to its final destination at Akwesasne on the Saint Lawrence River. The river is the source of 27 hydroelectric plants operated by Brookfield Power, which at capacity can produce up to 181 megawatts of power.

Historically, the river was a part of the "Highway of the Adirondacks", by which it was possible to travel hundreds of miles by canoe or guideboat with short stretches of portage connecting various waterways.  This route is still followed by the Northern Forest Canoe Trail, a  canoe trail from Old Forge to Fort Kent in Maine.  It is also the basis of the route of the Adirondack Canoe Classic, a three-day, 90-mile canoe race from Old Forge to Saranac Lake.

Communities along the Raquette River
Blue Mountain Lake, New York hamlet in the town of Indian Lake in Hamilton County
Long Lake in Hamilton County
Tupper Lake in Franklin County
Colton in St. Lawrence County
Hannawa Falls in St. Lawrence County
Potsdam in St. Lawrence County
Norwood in St. Lawrence County
Norfolk in St. Lawrence County
Massena in St. Lawrence County
Mohawk Nation of Akwesasne (or St. Regis Mohawk Reservation) in Franklin County

See also
List of New York rivers

References

Adirondacks
Rivers of New York (state)
Tributaries of the Saint Lawrence River
Rivers of Hamilton County, New York
Rivers of St. Lawrence County, New York
Northern Forest Canoe Trail